Enavatuzumab is a humanized monoclonal antibody used in the treatment of solid tumors.

Enavatuzumab was developed by Facet Biotech Corp.

References

Monoclonal antibodies